Alfred Lamb may refer to:

Alfred Lamb (Australian politician) (1845–1890), New South Wales politician
Alfred William Lamb (1824–1888), Missouri politician